Central Gujarat is region which is geographically located in center of Gujarat in India. 

It includes following districts:
Vadodara
Mahisagar
Anand (called Charotar)
Kheda
Panchmahal
Dahod
Chhota Udaipur
Ahmedabad

See also 
 Ratan Mahal Wildlife Sanctuary

References

External links 
 Charusat

Regions of Gujarat